State Trunk Highway 75 (often called Highway 75, STH-75 or WIS 75) is a  state highway in the southeastern part of U.S. state of Wisconsin. The highway runs from Wisconsin Highway 50 and Wisconsin Highway 83 in Paddock Lake north to Wisconsin Highway 20 east of Waterford. WIS 75 serves Kenosha and Racine Counties. The highway is maintained by the Wisconsin Department of Transportation.

Route description 

WIS 75 begins at an intersection with WIS 50 and WIS 83 in Paddock Lake. The highway heads north through the town of Salem before entering the town of Brighton. After crossing into Brighton, WIS 75 passes through the community of Klondike and skirts the eastern edge of the Richard Bong State Recreation Area. The route intersects WIS 142 northwest of the community of Brighton and continues northward into Racine County.

Upon entering Racine County, WIS 75 enters the town of Dover. It passes through the community of Kansasville and crosses a Canadian Pacific Railway line before meeting WIS 11. The highway continues north, passing Eagle Lake to the east. WIS 75 terminates at a junction with WIS 20 and County Highway S east of Waterford.

History
WIS 75 was originally designated in Milwaukee County between WIS 36 and WIS 19 (now U.S. Route 18) in 1917. In 1924, WIS 75 was changed to a route from Franklin south to Bristol; the northern terminus was truncated to WIS 36 in 1926. This route became part of U.S. Route 45 in 1934, and WIS 75 was moved to a route similar to its current one. The original route followed present-day WIS 142 west before continuing south and west on present-day county highways X, JB, and PH; the route between WIS 142 and County Highway PH was changed to 264th Avenue in 1935. During the construction of the Richard I. Bong Air Force Base in the 1950s, WIS 75 was rerouted along present-day WIS 142, US 45, and WIS 50 south of its junction with WIS 142. WIS 75 was permanently designated along its current route between WIS 142 and WIS 50 in 1963.

Major intersections

See also

References

External links

WIS 75 Terminus Photos

075
Transportation in Kenosha County, Wisconsin
Transportation in Racine County, Wisconsin
U.S. Route 45